Posterior median sulcus can refer to:
 Posterior median sulcus of spinal cord
 Posterior median sulcus of medulla oblongata